Arnium is a genus of fungi within the Lasiosphaeriaceae family.

References

External links
Arnium at Index Fungorum

Lasiosphaeriaceae